Qalat (also Romanized as Qalāt; also known as Qal”ah Qalat, Qal‘eh-i-Qalat, Qal‘eh-ye Qalāt, and Qal‘eh-ye Qolat) is a village in Charam Rural District, in the Central District of Charam County, Kohgiluyeh and Boyer-Ahmad Province, Iran. At the 2006 census, its population was 55, in 8 families.

References 

Populated places in Charam County